Talemaitoga Tuapati is a Fijian rugby union footballer. He plays hooker for the Woodlands rugby club and for Southland in New Zealand. Tuapati's selection to the Fijian squad came in 2010 after impressing selectors on the watch at the Pacific Rugby Cup tournament which included club teams from Fiji, Tonga and Samoa. He played at the 2014 Pacific Nations Cup.

In 2015 Tuapati was signed by Stade Français on a three-month deal as an injury replacement for Laurent Sempéré.

References

External links

Living people
Rugby union hookers
Fijian rugby union players
Fiji international rugby union players
1985 births
Fijian expatriate rugby union players
Expatriate rugby union players in New Zealand
Fijian expatriate sportspeople in New Zealand
Southland rugby union players
Sportspeople from Suva
People educated at Ratu Kadavulevu School
US Carcassonne players
Stade Français players
Provence Rugby players